Eduardo 'Edu' Ramos Gómez (born 17 February 1992) is a Spanish footballer who plays for Alhaurín de la Torre CF as a central midfielder.

He achieved Segunda División totals of 182 games and four goals over seven seasons, in service of four clubs. In La Liga, he represented Málaga and Villarreal (11 appearances).

Club career

Málaga
Born in Málaga, Andalusia, Ramos came through his hometown club Málaga CF's youth system. He made his first-team (and La Liga) debut at only 17 on 4 October 2009, as a second-half substitute in the 1–1 draw away against Xerez CD. He spent his first professional season, however, almost exclusively with the reserves, only appearing two more times in the league.

Ramos was deemed surplus to requirements alongside five other players in December 2010, shortly after the arrival of manager Manuel Pellegrini. On 5 January 2011, he was sent on loan to CD Leganés of Segunda División B until the end of the campaign.

Villarreal
On 11 July 2011, Ramos signed for Villarreal CF, with Málaga still having a buyback option on the player. Having started out with the third team, he was eventually promoted to the second in the Segunda División, making his debut – as a starter – on 3 February 2012 in a 0−0 home draw against FC Barcelona Atlètic.

Ramos scored his first goal for Villarreal B on 3 March 2012, in a 4−3 home win over CD Alcoyano. He made his official debut for the main squad on 14 December of the following year, starting the 2−1 loss at FC Barcelona.

Later career
On 9 July 2014, Ramos moved to Albacete Balompié, newly promoted to the second division. On 13 July 2016, after their relegation, he joined Córdoba CF.

On 30 August 2018, Ramos moved to fellow second tier side Cádiz CF on a one-year contract, with Córdoba holding a buyout clause. In May 2019, he agreed to a new two-year deal at the former; he contributed 17 games in 2019–20 to help his team to return to the top flight, then left by mutual consent in October 2020.

International career
Ramos represented the Spain under-17 team in the 2009 FIFA World Cup, a third-place finish in Nigeria. On 17 August 2010, he was selected by the under-19s for the SBS International Cup in Japan.

Honours
Spain U17
FIFA U-17 World Cup third place: 2009

References

External links

1992 births
Living people
Spanish footballers
Footballers from Málaga
Association football midfielders
La Liga players
Segunda División players
Segunda División B players
Tercera División players
Tercera Federación players
Atlético Malagueño players
Málaga CF players
CD Leganés players
Villarreal CF C players
Villarreal CF B players
Villarreal CF players
Albacete Balompié players
Córdoba CF players
Cádiz CF players
Marbella FC players
Spain youth international footballers